Barrie/Little Lake Water Aerodrome  was located on Little Lake on the north side of Barrie, Ontario, Canada.

The aerodrome served floatplanes, which parked along wooden docks along the south side of the lake, and was accessed via Little Lake Drive.

See also
Springwater (Barrie Airpark) Aerodrome
Lake Simcoe Regional Airport

References

Defunct seaplane bases in Ontario
Transport in Barrie